A verst is an obsolete Russian unit of length defined as 500 sazhen.

Plurals and variants
In the English language, verst is singular with the normal plural versts.

A  (literally 'border verst') is twice as long as a verst.

"The verst of the 17th century was 700 sazhens or 1.49 km as against the 500 sazhens or 1.067 km it became at the time of Peter the Great."

Finnish virsta
A  was originally 600  (fathoms, 1.781 m), but was then changed to 500 , since the Russian  was longer, 2.134 m. Metrication replaced  with the kilometre in the 1880s.

References

External links

Conversion table

Units of length
Customary units of measurement